Djibouti–Germany relations refers to bilateral relations between Djibouti and Germany.

History 
Diplomatic relations were established in 1978. The importance Germany attaches to relations with Djibouti was underlined by the opening of a German Embassy there in spring 2010. Djibouti, for its part, opened an embassy in Berlin in autumn 2011, its ambassador being accredited in late November 2011.

See also 
 Foreign relations of Germany
 Foreign relations of Djibouti

References 

 

Bilateral relations of Germany
Germany